The 1967 National Football League expansion draft was a National Football League (NFL) draft held on February 9, 1967 in which a new expansion team named the New Orleans Saints selected its first players. On November 1, 1966 (All Saints Day), NFL owners awarded its 16th team franchise to the city of New Orleans, Louisiana.  The Saints selected 42 players in total from every team roster except for the Atlanta Falcons, who had begun play in the 1966 season. The expansion draft included future Hall of Famer running back Paul Hornung, who set an NFL record by scoring 176 points in only 12 games in 1960 for the Green Bay Packers, but did not play in Super Bowl I. Hornung never played a down for the Saints and retired in the preseason due to a neck injury.

Following the expansion draft, the Saints signed Hornung's backfield mate with the Packers, Jim Taylor to a 10-year, $400,000 contract. Taylor played just one season in his home state (Taylor was a native of Baton Rouge and was an All-American at LSU) and retired in September 1968.

Player selections

References

National Football League expansion draft
Expansion
Nfl Expansion Draft, 1967
NFL expansion draft